William Owens (May 15, 1840 – June 8, 1917) was a Canadian politician.

Born in Stonefield, County of Argenteuil, Canada East, the son of Owen Owens and Charlotte Lindley, Owens was a lieutenant in the Active Militia. He was also mayor, councillor and postmaster of the Township of Chatham. He was elected to the Legislative Assembly of Quebec in the 1881 Quebec general election as the Conservative candidate in the riding of  Argenteuil. He was acclaimed in 1886 and re-elected in 1890. He resigned in 1891. He was appointed to the Senate on the advice of Mackenzie Bowell representing the senatorial division of Inkerman, Quebec on January 2, 1896. A Conservative, he served 21 years until his death in 1917.

References
 
 

1840 births
1917 deaths
Canadian senators from Quebec
Conservative Party of Canada (1867–1942) senators
Conservative Party of Quebec MNAs
Mayors of places in Quebec
People from Laurentides
Anglophone Quebec people
Canadian people of Welsh descent